The 1913–14 Iowa State Cyclones men's basketball team (also known informally as Ames) represented Iowa State University during the 1913-14 NCAA College men's basketball season. The Cyclones were coached by Homer Hubbard, who was in his third season with the Cyclones. They played their home games at the State Gymnasium in Ames, Iowa.

They finished the season 4–14, 4–10 in Missouri Valley play to finish in second place in the North division.

Roster

Schedule and results 

|-
!colspan=6 style=""|Regular Season

|-

References 

Iowa State Cyclones men's basketball seasons
Iowa State
Iowa State Cyc
Iowa State Cyc